Vladimir Schneider (born April 16 1966, Armavir, Krasnodar Territory) is a Russian historian, Doctor of Historical Sciences. He is the author of more than 120 scientific works, among which 6 monographs. He is a professor in the department of universal and national history of Armavir State Pedagogical University. Worked as dean of the history department of ASPU from 1999 to 2011. The main directions of scientific work: the socio-cultural aspect of the history of the peoples of the North Caucasus; Soviet national policy in the North Caucasus of 1917 - the end of the 1950s; the history of the deportations, the stay at the special settlement and the rehabilitation of the North Caucasian peoples; historical and cultural integration processes in the North Caucasus; the history of the German diaspora in the Kuban; historical research methodology issues.

Biography 
V.G. Schneider was born in 1966, his childhood and youth were spent in Armavir, graduated from Kuban State University. Specializes in the field of social history of peoples North Caucasus / North Caucasus, also studies the history of ethno-cultural associations that have arisen and exist in the conditions of the city. He wrote the history of the German community of Armavir from the last third of the XIX and until the beginning of the XXI centuries, and also worked in the field of research methodology of the history of the origin and development of communities in the numerically dominant foreign ethnic and foreign cultural environment.

After serving in the army in 1987, Vladimir G. entered the history department of the Kuban State University. At that time, perestroika was taking place in the country and in Soviet social science, at the faculty the teachers discovered new research methodologies for themselves and shared them with students. Students created various interest clubs, participated in political discussions, of which Vladimir was an active participant.

V.G. Schneider graduated from university in 1992, already in the new state, when, it seemed, many roads opened up for the young specialist. Vladimir G. returns to Armavir and begins his scientific and professional activities as a teacher in the department of cultural studies Armavir State Pedagogical Institute (AGPI).

From 1994 to 1996, Schneider VG He studied at the graduate school of the AGPI, which he successfully completed by defending his thesis for the degree of candidate of historical sciences on the topic: “Workers of the North Caucasus (end of the XIX century - February 1917): history of social formation)”.

Due to deep scientific knowledge, the desire to learn new things, creativity and democracy in relations with students, Vladimir G. became one of the most popular teachers of the faculty, where he teaches.

V.G. Schneider has a wide range of scientific interests: Russian and world culture, the deportation of North Caucasian peoples and their rehabilitation, the national policy of the Soviet state in the North Caucasus, and much more.

In 2008, Vladimir defended his doctoral thesis on the topic “National construction as a factor in the sociocultural integration of the peoples of the North Caucasus into Soviet society (1917 - the end of the 1950s)” at Stavropol State University and the following year occupied the position of professor of the Russian history department in the 20th century . in ASPU. He still leads the main courses, deals with the history of Russia from the point of view of macro-history, traces the long-term social and historical dynamics of the processes of state expansion and decline, bureaucratization and secularization, revolutions and wars.

In 2011–2012 V.G. Schneider worked in an administrative position, as a vice-rector for research and innovation activities at ASPU. Elected member of the Dissertation Council on Historical Sciences in Adygei State University.

In September 2012, he moved to the Armavir branch of the Kuban State University, where he worked until 2017.

Since September 2017, Vladimir Gennadyevich has been working as a professor in the department of general and national history of Armavir State Pedagogical University.

Awards 
 Diploma of the Ministry of Education and Science of the Russian Federation for significant contribution to the training of highly qualified specialists, significant successes in scientific and pedagogical and research work and many years of fruitful work. Order dated April 21, 2008 No. 679 / к-н

Books and articles 
 Шнайдер В. Г. «Немецкие книги» АОАА как исторический источник - Москва|Берлин: Директ-Медиа, 2015
 Шнайдер В. Г. Социально-политические циклы в истории России : природа и механика - Москва|Берлин: Директ-Медиа, 2015
 Шнайдер В. Г. Советское нациестроительство на Северном Кавказе (1917 – конец 1950-х гг.) : закономерности и противоречия: монография - Москва|Берлин: Директ-Медиа, 2015
 Шнайдер В. Г. Советская национальная политика и народы Северного Кавказа в 1940–1950-е гг.: монография - Москва|Берлин: Директ-Медиа, 2015
 
 Шнайдер В.Г., Шхачемуков Р.М., Койчуев А.Д. Становление и развитие рабочего класса на Северном Кавказе в конце XIX – начале ХХ вв.: историография проблемы // Вестник Адыгейского государственного университета. Вып. 3(224). 2018. С. 68-76
 Шнайдер В.Г. Октябрьская революция в контексте социально-политических циклов в истории России// Материалы Всероссийской научной конференции «Великая российская революция: формирование исторического сознания»/ Вестник Адыгейского государственного университета, 2017, Вып.4. – С. 276-277.
 Шнайдер В.Г. Методы и приемы исследования этнокультурной общины в городских условиях// Исторические, философские, политические и юридические науки, культурология и искусствоведение. Вопросы теории и практики. Часть 3. 2014. No.5 (43). – С. 211-215.
 Шнайдер В.Г. Этнокультурная община в городских условиях: опыт локально-исторического исследования// Исторические, философские, политические и юридические науки, культурология и искусствоведение. Вопросы теории и практики. - Тамбов: Грамота, 2013. No.5(31): в 2-х ч. Ч. II. – С. 215-220
 Голованова С.А., Шнайдер В.Г. Понятие "frontier" в современной кавказоведческой литературе// Вестник Адыгейского государственного университета. 2012, No.3 (102). - С. 59-67.
 
 
 
 
 
 
Шнайдер В.Г. Рабочие Северного Кавказа (последняя треть XIX в. – февраль 1917 г.): становление социального слоя.  Армавир: Полипринт, 2016. – 176 с.

References

External links
 Шнайдер Владимир Геннадьевич - российский историк

Russian emigrants to Belgium
1966 births
Living people